Melancholia is a 2011 apocalyptic drama art film written and directed by Lars von Trier and starring Kirsten Dunst, Charlotte Gainsbourg, and Kiefer Sutherland, with Alexander Skarsgård, Brady Corbet, Cameron Spurr, Charlotte Rampling, Jesper Christensen, John Hurt, Stellan Skarsgård, and Udo Kier in supporting roles. The film's story revolves around two sisters, one of whom marries just before a rogue planet is about to collide with Earth. Melancholia is the second film in von Trier's unofficially titled Depression Trilogy. It was preceded in 2009 by Antichrist and followed by Nymphomaniac in 2013.

On 18 May 2011, Melancholia premiered at the 64th Cannes Film Festival, where it was received with critical acclaim and Dunst received the festival's Best Actress Award for her performance, which was a common area of praise among critics. Although it has detractors, many critics and film scholars have considered the film to be the best of the director's trilogy and a personal masterpiece. Along with von Trier's previous film Dogville (2003), it was included in the 2016 poll of the greatest films since 2000 conducted by BBC.

It has since been featured in various listings of the best films of 2011, the best films of the 2010s, and the best films of the 21st century.

Plot 

A dream sequence showcases slow-motion shots of the main characters, a collapsing horse, falling birds, butterflies, different planets, and images of the Earth colliding with a rogue planet.

Part One: Justine
The dream belongs to Justine, who weds Michael in a castle owned by her brother-in-law John and her sister Claire. Justine and Michael are late for the reception due to their stretch limousine's difficulty traversing the narrow and winding rural road. Upon their arrival, Justine sees a star in the sky shining brightly. John, an astronomy enthusiast, explains it is the star Antares. The festivities are less than harmonious; Justine's divorced parents Gaby and Dexter verbally abuse each other in front of the guests. Justine, to John and Claire's annoyance, keeps wandering away. Justine's employer Jack, who announces her promotion to art director of his advertising firm, expects her to write a slogan for a new campaign during the celebration. Justine finds herself pushed into a role that others have chosen for her and falls back into depression, from which she has been suffering for a long time. Toward the end of the party, which goes on until the early hours of the morning, she quits her job in an argument and calls off her marriage to Michael after cheating on him. Early the following morning, while horseriding with Claire, Justine notices Antares is no longer visible in the sky.

Part Two: Claire
Justine returns home with Claire, but sinks even further into depression, and is welcomed back to John and Claire's estate, where she struggles to leave her bed and is unable to eat. According to John, Antares's absence is due to the rogue planet "Melancholia". The planet appeared from behind the Sun and passed in front of Antares. John announces that according to the scientists' calculations, Melancholia will pass in close proximity to Earth, but will not collide with it. Claire looks anxiously at Melancholia's path on the Internet, learning of a predicted collision with Earth. John tries to calm her down but secretly secures food and gasoline. In view of the approaching planet, Claire increasingly loses her composure, while Justine longs for the end of the world and "sunbathes" naked in the planet's glow at night.

Strange omens pile up in the days that follow. The electricity in the castle goes out, the butler does not come to work, the horses in the stable are restless, St. Elmo's fires emerge at various times, and the weather changes erratically. Melancholia initially flies past Earth, seemingly vindicating John. Melancholia then crosses Earth's orbit a second time, however, now moving directly toward Earth. Upon this discovery, John commits suicide by overdosing on pills. Claire hides his death from the family and attempts to flee with her son Leo, but the cars will not start. Justine declines to spend her final moments with Claire on the terrace by candlelight and wine. Instead, Justine calms Leo down by suggesting that they build a "magic cave" out of branches. Shortly before the collision, Justine, Claire, and Leo sit under the "cave" and hold hands. While Justine and Leo seem apathetic to, or at peace with their impending doom, Claire panics and despairs. Melancholia finally collides with Earth, engulfing them in a sea of flames as both planets shatter against each other.

Cast

Production

Inspiration
Von Trier's initial inspiration for the film came from a depressive episode he suffered. The film is a Danish production by Zentropa, with international co-producers in Denmark, Sweden, France, and Germany.

Filming took place in Sweden. Melancholia prominently features music from the prelude to Richard Wagner's opera Tristan und Isolde (1857–1859). It is the second entry in von Trier's unofficially titled "Depression Trilogy", preceded by Antichrist and followed by Nymphomaniac.

Development
The idea for the film originated during a therapy session Lars von Trier attended during treatments for his depression. A therapist had told von Trier that depressive people tend to act more calmly than others under heavy pressure, because they already expect bad things to happen. Von Trier then developed the story not primarily as a disaster film, and without any ambition to portray astrophysics realistically, but as a way to examine the human psyche during a disaster.

The idea of a planetary collision was inspired by websites with theories about such events. Von Trier decided from the outset that it would be clear from the beginning that the world would actually end in the film, so audiences would not be distracted by the suspense of not knowing. The concept of the two sisters as main characters developed via an exchange of letters between von Trier and the Spanish actress Penélope Cruz. Cruz wrote that she would like to work with von Trier, and spoke enthusiastically about the play The Maids by Jean Genet. As von Trier subsequently tried to write a role for the actress, the two maids from the play evolved into the sisters Justine and Claire in Melancholia. Much of the personality of the character Justine was based on von Trier himself. The name was inspired by the Marquis de Sade novel Justine (1791).

Melancholia was produced by Denmark's Zentropa, with co-production support from its subsidiary in Germany, Sweden's Memfis Film, France's Slot Machine, and Liberator Productions. The production received 7.9 million Danish kroner from the Danish Film Institute, 600,000 euro from Eurimages,and 3 million Swedish kronor from the Swedish Film Institute. Additional funding was provided by Film i Väst, DR, Arte France, CNC, Canal+, BIM Italy, Filmstiftung Nordrhein-Westfalen, Sveriges Television, and Nordisk Film & TV-Fond. The total budget was 52.5 million Danish kroner.

Cruz was initially expected to play the lead role, but dropped out when the filming schedule of another project was changed. Von Trier then offered the role to Kirsten Dunst, who accepted it. Dunst had been suggested for the role by the American filmmaker Paul Thomas Anderson in a discussion about the film between him and von Trier.

Filming 

Principal photography began 22 July and ended 8 September 2010. Interior scenes were shot at Film i Väst's studios in Trollhättan, Sweden. It was the fourth time von Trier made a film in Trollhättan. Exteriors included the area surrounding the Tjolöholm Castle. The film was recorded digitally with Arri Alexa and Phantom cameras. Von Trier employed his usual directing style with no rehearsals; instead the actors improvised and received instructions between the takes. The camera was initially operated by von Trier, and then left to cinematographer Manuel Alberto Claro who repeated von Trier's movements. Claro said about the method: "[von Trier] wants to experience the situations the first time. He finds an energy in the scenes, presence, and makes up with the photographic aesthetics." Von Trier explained that the visual style he aimed at in Melancholia was "a clash between what is romantic and grand and stylized and then some form of reality", which he hoped to achieve through the hand-held camerawork. He feared, however, that it would tilt too much toward the romantic, because of the setting at the upscale wedding, and the castle, which he called "super kitschy".

Post-production 
The prelude to Richard Wagner's Tristan und Isolde supplies the main musical theme of the film, and von Trier's use of an overture-like opening sequence before the first act is a technique closely associated with Wagner. This choice was inspired by a 30-page section of Marcel Proust's In Search of Lost Time, where Proust concludes that Wagner's prelude is the greatest work of art of all time. Melancholia uses music more than any film by von Trier since The Element of Crime from 1984. In some scenes, the film was edited in the same pace as the music. Von Trier said: "It's kind of like a music video that way. It's supposed to be vulgar." Von Trier also pointed out parallels between both the film's usage of Wagner and the film's editing to the music and the aesthetics of Nazi Germany.

Visual effects were provided by companies in Poland, Germany, and Sweden under visual effects supervisor Peter Hjorth. Poland's Platige Image, which previously had worked with von Trier on Antichrist, created most of the effects seen in the film's opening sequence; the earliest instructions were provided by von Trier in the summer 2010, after which a team of 19 visual effects artists worked on the project for three months.

Release 
In his director's statement, von Trier wrote that he had started to regret having made such a polished film, but that he hoped it would contain some flaws which would make it interesting: "I desired to dive headlong into the abyss of German romanticism ... But is that not just another way of expressing defeat? Defeat to the lowest of cinematic common denominators? Romance is abused in all sorts of endlessly dull ways in mainstream products."

The premiere took place at the 2011 Cannes Film Festival, where Melancholia was screened in competition on 18 May. The press conference after the screening gained considerable publicity. The Hollywood Reporter'''s Scott Roxborough wrote that "Von Trier has never been very P.C. and his Cannes press conferences always play like a dark stand-up routine, but at the Melancholia press conference he took it to another level, tossing a grenade into any sense of public decorum." Von Trier first joked about working on a hardcore pornographic film that would star Dunst and Gainsbourg. When asked about the relation between the influences of German Romanticism in Melancholia and von Trier's own German heritage, the director brought up that he had been raised believing his biological father was a Jew, only to learn as an adult that his actual father was a German. He then made jokes about Jews and Nazis, said he understood Adolf Hitler and admired the work of architect Albert Speer, and jokingly announced that he was a Nazi. The Cannes Film Festival issued an official apology for the remarks the same day and clarified that von Trier is not a Nazi or an anti-Semite, then declared the director "persona non grata" the following day. This meant he was not allowed to go within 100 meters of the Festival Palace, but he did remain in Cannes and continued to give promotional interviews.

On 26 May 2011, the film was released in Denmark through Nordisk Film. Launched on 57 screens, the film entered the box-office chart as number three. A total of 50,000 tickets were eventually sold in Denmark. It was released in the United Kingdom and Ireland on 30 September, in Germany on 6 October and in Italy on 21 October. Magnolia Pictures acquired the distribution rights for North America and it was released on 11 November, with a pre-theatrical release on 13 October as a rental through such Direct TV vendors as Vudu and Amazon. Madman Entertainment bought the rights for Australia and New Zealand.

 Reception 

 Critical response 
On review aggregator Rotten Tomatoes, 80% of 206 critic reviews are positive, and the average rating is 7.5/10. The website's critical consensus states, "Melancholias dramatic tricks are more obvious than they should be, but this is otherwise a showcase for Kirsten Dunst's acting and for Lars von Trier's profound, visceral vision of depression and destruction." According to Metacritic, the film received "generally favorable reviews", based on an average score of 80/100 from 40 critics. A 2017 data analysis of Metacritic reviews by Gizmodo UK found the film to be the most critically divisive film of recent years.

Kim Skotte of Politiken compared the film with the director's previous work: "There are images—many images—in Melancholia which underline that Lars von Trier is a unique film storyteller... The choice of material and treatment of it underlines Lars von Trier's originality... Through its material and look, Melancholia creates rifts, but unlike Antichrist I don't feel that there is a fence pole in the rift which is smashed directly down into the meat. You sit on your seat in the cinema and mildly marveled go along in the end of the world."Berlingske's Ebbe Iversen wrote about the film: "It is big, it is enigmatic, and now and then rather irritating. But it is also a visionary work, which makes a gigantic impression. From time to time the film moves on the edge of kitsch, but with Justine played by Kirsten Dunst and Claire played by Charlotte Gainsbourg as the leading characters, Melancholia is a bold, uneven, unruly and completely unforgettable film."

Steven Loeb of Southampton Patch wrote: "This film has brought the best out of von Trier, as well as his star. Dunst is so good in this film, playing a character unlike any other she has ever attempted, that she won the award for Best Actress at the Cannes Film Festival this past May. Even if the film itself were not the incredible work of art that it is, Dunst's performance alone would be incentive enough to recommend it."

Sukhdev Sandhu wrote from Cannes in The Daily Telegraph that the film "at times comes close to being a tragi-comic opera about the end of the world," and that, "the apocalypse, when it comes, is so beautifully rendered that the film cements the quality of fairy tale that its palatial setting suggests." About the actors' performances, Sandhu wrote: "all of them are excellent here, but Dunst is exceptional, so utterly convincing in the lead role—troubled, serene, a fierce savant—that it feels like a career breakthrough. Meanwhile, Gainsbourg, for whom the end of the world must seem positively pastoral after the horrors she went through in Antichrist, locates in Claire a fragility that ensures she's more than a whipping girl for social satire." Sandhu brought up one reservation in the review, in which he gave the film the highest possible rating of five stars: "there is, as always with Von Trier's work, a degree of intellectual determinism that can be off-putting; he illustrates rather than truly explore ideas." Peter Bradshaw, writing for The Guardian, stated "Windup merchant Lars von Trier is back with a film about the end of the world – but it's not to be taken entirely seriously", and gave it three stars out of a possible five.

In 2020, amid the COVID-19 pandemic, an Atlantic culture writer found "the perspective of a catastrophe-minded person thrust into a state of actual catastrophe finds perhaps no better creative expression" than in the film. BBC Culture stated that "arguably no film has been more profoundly compassionate in its depiction of a mental crisis".

 Accolades 
Dunst received the Best Actress Award at the closing ceremony of the Cannes Film Festival. The film won three awards at the European Film Awards for Best Film, Best Cinematographer (Manuel Alberto Claro), and Best Designer (Jette Lehmann).

The U.S. National Society of Film Critics selected Melancholia as the best picture of 2011 and named Kirsten Dunst best actress. The film was also nominated for four Australian Academy of Cinema and Television Arts Awards: Best Film – International; Best Direction – International for von Trier, Best Screenplay – International also for von Trier, and Best Actress – International for Dunst.Film Comment magazine listed Melancholia third on its Best Films of 2011 list. The film also received 12 votes—seven from critics and five from directors—in the British Film Institute's 2012 Sight & Sound poll of the greatest movies ever made, making it one of the few films of the 21st century to appear within the top 250. In 2016, the film was named as the 43rd best film of the 21st century, from a poll of 177 film critics from around the world. In 2019, Time listed it as one of the best films of the 2010s decade, while Cahiers du cinéma named it the eighth best film of the 2010s. That same year, Vulture named Melancholia the best film of the 2010s.

 Stage play adaptation 
In 2018, playwright Declan Greene adapted the film into a stage play for Malthouse Theatre in Melbourne, Australia. The cast featured Eryn Jean Norvill as Justine, Leeanna Walsman as Claire, Gareth Yuen as Michael, Steve Mouzakis as John, and Maude Davey as Gaby, while child actors Liam Smith and Alexander Artemov shared the role of Leo. In the adaptation, the character of Dexter, Justine's father is omitted, while Justine's boss, Jack, is combined with John.

 See also 

 Nibiru cataclysm
 Cinema of Denmark
 Impact events in popular culture
 List of apocalyptic films
 When Worlds Collide (1951 film)
 Gorath Hellstar Remina''

References

Bibliography

External links 

 
 
 
 
 
 

2010s psychological drama films
2010s science fiction drama films
2011 drama films
2011 films
2011 independent films
Adultery in films
Antares in fiction
Best Danish Film Bodil Award winners
Best Danish Film Robert Award winners
Danish independent films
Danish nonlinear narrative films
Danish science fiction drama films
English-language Danish films
English-language French films
English-language German films
English-language Italian films
English-language Swedish films
European Film Awards winners (films)
Films about depression
Films about psychiatry
Films about sisters
Films about weddings
Films directed by Lars von Trier
Films set in country houses
Films shot in Trollhättan
French independent films
French nonlinear narrative films
French psychological drama films
French science fiction drama films
German independent films
German nonlinear narrative films
German science fiction drama films
Films about impact events
Italian independent films
Italian psychological drama films
Italian science fiction drama films
National Society of Film Critics Award for Best Film winners
Rogue planets in fiction
Sun in a Net Awards winners (films)
Swedish independent films
Swedish science fiction drama films
Works about melancholia
Zentropa films
2010s English-language films
Films produced by Louise Vesth
2010s French films
2010s German films
2010s Swedish films